Harriet was an American band from Los Angeles, California, fronted by songwriter and keyboard player Alex Casnoff (formerly of Dawes and Papa), with Henry Kwapis on drums, Patrick Kelly on electric bass, and Matt Blitzer on guitar.

History

The band was formed in 2011 when Casnoff left Dawes in order to pursue his own music.  The band then consisted of Casnoff, Kwapis, and Casnoff's long-time friend and collaborator Aaron Harrison Folb on electric and synth bass.  The trio was joined by guitar player and engineer Sean O'Brien to record their first EP entitled "Tell The Right Story" at The Hangar recording studio in Sacramento, California.  O'Brien was unable to permanently join the band, but recommended fellow guitarist Adam Gunther, who ended up joining them for live shows in support of the EP, as well as for the video shoot of the single from the EP entitled "I Slept With All Your Mothers."  Folb and Gunther were eventually replaced by Kelly and Blitzer later in 2012.

The band was later signed with Harvest Records, recorded and released a second self-titled EP, and released videos for the songs "Irish Margaritas," "Burbank," "Up Against It," and "Ten Steps."

The band broke up in 2017.

References

Americana music groups